Richard John Briley (June 25, 1925 – December 14, 2019) was an American writer best known for screenplays of biographical films. He won the Best Original Screenplay Oscar at the 55th Academy Awards for Gandhi (1982). As well as film scripts, he wrote for television and theatre, and published several novels.

Biography
Briley was born in Kalamazoo, Michigan, and served in the United States Army Air Forces, 1943–46, reaching the rank of captain. At the University of Michigan, he gained a BA in 1950 and an MA in English 1951. He married Dorothy Louise Reichart in 1950, and they had four children. He worked in public relations for General Motors before rejoining the air force in 1955. He was posted to RAF Northolt airbase at South Ruislip near London, where he was director of orientation activities and started writing.

In 1960, he earned a PhD in Elizabethan drama from the University of Birmingham, left the air force and became a staff writer with MGM-British in Borehamwood. While with the studio, he wrote the script for Children of the Damned (1964), effectively a sequel of Village of the Damned (1960), but objected to the changes made for the finished film. He left MGM in 1964. He also had an uncredited part in the comedy Situation Hopeless... But Not Serious (1965).

Gandhi

Briley's script for Pope Joan (1972) attracted the interest of Richard Attenborough, although Attenborough was ultimately not involved in that project, and the film was critically panned. Several scripts for Attenborough's Gandhi project had been rejected, and Robert Bolt was scheduled to rewrite his own earlier draft when he suffered a stroke. Attenborough then turned to Briley. Briley shifted the focus of the narrative away from the point of view of the British in India to that of the Indian independence movement. He originally opposed Ben Kingsley in the title role, favouring John Hurt, but was later glad that Attenborough had cast Kingsley. Briley envisaged more emphasis on the relationship between Gandhi and Jawaharlal Nehru, but Kingsley's towering performance came to dominate the finished film. Briley claims he and Attenborough were personally satisfied with the movie and unconcerned about any critical and commercial success. In the event, Briley's original screenplay won the Oscar and the Golden Globe. Attenborough later said of Briley, "He's a difficult bugger, a bit of a prima-donna, but the bastard's brilliant".

Later life
In 1985, Briley began developing a musical about Martin Luther King Jr., writing the book and lyrics and acting as co-producer, originally for American Playhouse. He left the project in February 1989 after contract negotiations broke down. A different version opened in London in 1990. Briley attempted to obtain an injunction, claiming he had paid the King family $200,000 in personality rights.

In 1987, Briley again teamed up with Attenborough for Cry Freedom, about the South African anti-apartheid activist Steve Biko. Briley had disagreements with Donald Woods, the journalist whose books formed the basis of the script. Briley viewed the nonviolence of the Black Consciousness Movement as principled, whereas Woods felt it was a tactical decision. Although Woods feared Briley lacked an awareness of the complexities of political debate among black South Africans, those shown a preview of the film felt it was realistic.

In 1993, Briley switched agents from International Creative Management to the William Morris Agency. In 1998, he was a founding partner of "the Film Makers Company", a venture intended to encourage film production in Bridgeport, Connecticut, and was planning to relocate to there. He was given a Lifetime Achievement Award at the Big Bear Lake International Film Festival in 2000. He died on December 14, 2019, aged 94.

Unproduced scripts
Unproduced scripts on which Briley worked include: adaptations of Henderson the Rain King, Mister God, This Is Anna, White Fang, and his own novel How Sleep the Brave; biopics of Franz Kafka, Genghis Khan – to have been directed by Shin Sang-ok, Tina Modotti (A Fragile Life), Beryl Markham (West with the Night), and Pope John Paul II; The Cross and the Crescent, about Francis of Assisi and the Crusades; and a miniseries about the Italian Renaissance. Briley's adaptation of Arthur Miller's play The Crucible was dropped when Miller's son Robert secured production rights; Arthur Miller himself wrote the screenplay for the 1996 film.

Works

Film

Other

References

External links

1925 births
2019 deaths
20th-century American novelists
20th-century American male writers
20th-century American dramatists and playwrights
20th-century American screenwriters
Best Original Screenplay Academy Award winners
American male screenwriters
American thriller writers
American spy fiction writers
American romantic fiction writers
American musical theatre librettists
United States Air Force officers
Shakespearean scholars
University of Michigan College of Literature, Science, and the Arts alumni
Alumni of the University of Birmingham
Writers from Kalamazoo, Michigan
Best Screenplay Golden Globe winners
American male novelists
American male dramatists and playwrights
Novelists from Michigan
Screenwriters from Michigan
United States Army Air Forces officers
United States Army Air Forces personnel of World War II